The United States sent 204 athletes to the 2006 Winter Olympics in Turin, Italy. Chris Witty, a four-time Olympian, who competed in both Summer and Winter games, and won a gold medal in speed skating at the 2002 Games, served as the flag bearer at the opening ceremonies. Speed skater Joey Cheek, who won gold in the 500 m and silver in the 1000 m, was the flag bearer at the closing ceremonies. One athlete, Sarah Konrad, became the first American woman to compete in two different disciplines at the same Winter Olympics – biathlon and cross-country skiing.

While the United States' total medal count was down from the 2002 Winter Olympics, there were many highlights to the Games. Pete Fenson led the U.S. Curling team to a bronze medal, their first curling medal ever won. Speed skater Shani Davis became the first athlete of African descent from any country to win an individual gold medal. He won gold in the 1,000 m and followed that with a silver medal in the 1,500 m. Ice dancers Tanith Belbin and Benjamin Agosto won America's first figure skating ice dancing medal in 30 years.

Medalists

The following U.S. competitors won medals at the games. In the by discipline sections below, medalists' names are bolded.

| width="78%" align="left" valign="top" |

| width=22% align=left valign=top |

Alpine skiing

The American alpine ski team fell short of its self-proclaimed goal of eight medals, earning only two in Turin, both gold. Bode Miller, who won two gold medals at the 2005 World Championships, failed to medal in Turin, but the men's team still earned a gold medal, as Ted Ligety took a surprise victory in the combined. The other medal came from Julia Mancuso, who put together two strong runs to win the women's giant slalom.

Men

Women

Biathlon 

The top finish from the U.S. biathlon team came from Jay Hakkinen, who was 10th in the men's individual event.

Men

Women

Bobsleigh 

Shauna Rohbock and Valerie Fleming, bronze medalists at the 2005 World Championships, had four strong runs to earn the United States' only bobsleigh medal in Turin.

Men

Women

Cross-country skiing 

Two skiers, Kikkan Randall and Leif-Orin Zimmermann, were suspended due to health reasons for the first five days of competition after showing abnormally high values of hemoglobin in their blood. Randall eventually was cleared to compete, participating in the women's relay and finishing 53rd in the 10 kilometre classical race.

Distance
Men

Women

Sprint
Men

Women

Curling 

In the men's event, Pete Fenson, who led his team to 4th place at the a 2006 World Championships, started inconsistently, with a 2–2 record that included a win over the defending gold medalists from Norway. A stretch of four straight wins, however, guaranteed them a spot in the medal round going into a final round-robin game with Canada. The Americans lost that game, meaning they would face Canada again in the semifinals. They also lost this second meeting, but recovered to win the United States' first ever curling medal by beating Great Britain 8–6 in the bronze medal game.

On the women's side, Cassandra Johnson, the 2005 World Championship silver medalist, struggled winning only two games and finishing well short of the mark needed to make the medal round.

Summary

Men's tournament

Team

Round-robin

Draw 1
Monday, February 13, 9:00

Draw 3
Tuesday, February 14, 14:00

Draw 6
Thursday, February 16, 14:00

Draw 9
Saturday, February 18, 14:00

Draw 12
Monday, February 20, 14:00

Draw 2
Monday, February 13, 19:00

Draw 5
Wednesday, February 15, 19:00

Draw 8
Friday, February 17, 19:00

Draw 10
Sunday, February 19, 9:00

Semifinal
Wednesday, February 22, 19:00

Bronze medal game
Friday, February 24, 13:00

Women's tournament

Team

Round-robin

Draw 1
Monday, February 13, 14:00

Draw 3
Tuesday, February 14, 19:00

Draw 6
Thursday, February 16, 19:00

Draw 9
Saturday, February 18, 19:00

Draw 12
Monday, February 20, 19:00

Draw 2
Tuesday, February 14, 9:00

Draw 4
Wednesday, February 15, 14:00

Draw 7
Friday, February 17, 14:00

Draw 10
Sunday, February 19, 14:00

Key: The hammer indicates which team had the last stone in the first end.

Figure skating 

The American figure skating team won two medals in Turin, both silver. Sasha Cohen led the ladies' singles event after the short program, but an early fall in the free skate left her in second place. In the ice dance, the team of Tanith Belbin and Benjamin Agosto sat just sixth after the compulsory dance, but moved up the standings in the original dance, claiming the second silver medal. Michelle Kwan, an Olympic medalist in Nagano and Salt Lake, planned to compete in Turin, but pulled out due to a severe groin strain. Emily Hughes competed in place of Kwan.

Individual

Mixed

Freestyle skiing 

The American freestyle skiing team in Turin boasted several medalists from previous Olympics, including 1998 aerials gold medalist Eric Bergoust. Two other skiers had won gold medals at the World Championships, Jeremy Bloom and Hannah Kearney. Despite this strong roster, the U.S. team won just a single medal in Turin, as Toby Dawson rose from 6th place in qualification to take bronze in the men's moguls. Kearney's failure to even advance from the qualifiers in the women's moguls was considering one of the team's disappointing performances.

Men

Women

Ice hockey 

The U.S. men's team, which won a silver medal on home ice in Salt Lake City, had a poor start when they suffered a surprising 3–3 tie against Latvia. They did rebound with a win over Kazakhstan, but further losses to Slovakia, Sweden and Russia meant that the Americans finished fourth in their group, with the lowest point total of any team advancing to the medal round. In their quarterfinal against undefeated Finland, the Americans quickly fell behind 2–0, but managed to tie the game early in the second period. However, the Finns again took a two-goal lead later in the second, and while the Americans managed to score once more, they could not get closer than a 4–3 loss.

The women's team, also defending silver medalists, had a very strong round-robin showing, winning their three games by a combined score of 18–3. In the semifinals, the U.S. team played Sweden, with the Americans taking a 2–0 lead early in the second period.  However, the Swedes then rallied, scoring twice to tie the game, and holding off the American attack and forcing a shootout to decide the game. Swedish goaltender Kim Martin stopped four American shooters, while Pernilla Winberg and Maria Rooth scored for Sweden. The American women bounced back from this loss in the bronze medal game, beating Finland 4–0.

Summary

Men's tournament

Roster

Group play

Quarterfinal

Women's tournament

Roster

Group play

Semifinal

Bronze medal game

Luge 

Tony Benshoof was in position to win America's first singles luge medal after the first two runs, but two slower efforts on the final two runs left him in fourth place. Courtney Zablocki had a similar story in the women's event, with a pair of slow runs dropping her well off the medal pace after being in contention for bronze early.

Men

Women

Nordic combined 

Todd Lodwick, who had the United States' best Nordic combined performance in Olympic history in Salt Lake City, finished in the top 10 in both individual events, with his 8th place in the Individual Gundersen the best showing for the U.S. in Turin.

Short track speed skating 

Apolo Anton Ohno became the fourth US Winter Olympian to win three medals in a single games, taking gold in the 500 metres to go with two bronze medals. The only other American to make an 'A-Final' in Turin was Rusty Smith, who set an Olympic record time in the quarterfinals of the 1000 metres, but ended up fourth in the final.

Men

Women

Skeleton 

Zach Lund, considered the U.S.'s primary medal threat in the skeleton events, did not compete in the games after testing positive for finasteride. Lund contested the test at the Court of Arbitration for Sport (CAS), but had his claim rejected. His ban was reduced from two years to one, but this still left in ineligible in Turin. In Lund's absence, the best finishes were a pair of 6ths, from Eric Bernotas and Katie Uhlaender in the men's and women's events, respectively.

Ski jumping 

No American ski jumper qualified for a final jump in Turin, though Alan Alborn advanced to the first round in both the large and normal hill events.

Snowboarding 

The United States was the dominant nation in the Snowboarding events in Turin. The U.S. won seven medals, easily the most of any country, including three golds, from Shaun White and Hannah Teter in the men's and women's halfpipe and from Seth Wescott in men's snowboard cross. Lindsey Jacobellis was poised to give the Americans a fourth gold medal in the women's snowboard cross, but fell on the final hill while attempting a grab, was passed, and ended up with silver.

Freestyle
Men

Women

Parallel

Snowboard cross

Speed skating 

Three American men combined to win seven medals in Turin. This included three for Chad Hedrick, who entered the Games attempting to equal Eric Heiden's record of five gold medals. Hedrick won his first event, the 5000 metres, but when the men's pursuit team lost to Italy, his chances were dashed. He did not manage a second gold, but did win a silver and a bronze. Hedrick was the source of some controversy when he called out teammate Shani Davis, who skipped the team pursuit in order to prepare for his specialty, the 1000 metres. Davis won this event to become the first ever Winter Olympic individual gold medalist of African descent. The third medalist was Joey Cheek, who won gold in the 500 metres, and was chosen to carry the U.S. flag in the closing ceremonies.

Distance
Men

Women

Team Pursuit

See also
 United States at the 2006 Winter Paralympics

References

External links
 Official page of the U.S. Olympic Committee
 Official site for the 2006 U.S. Olympic Team - Site includes ability to search by sport, state, and an interactive Olympic guide

Nations at the 2006 Winter Olympics
2006
Winter Olympics